Neobidessus pullus is a species of predaceous diving beetle in the family Dytiscidae. It is found in North America and the Neotropics.

Subspecies
These two subspecies belong to the species Neobidessus pullus:
 Neobidessus pullus floridanus (Fall, 1917)
 Neobidessus pullus pullus (LeConte, 1855)

References

Further reading

 
 

Dytiscidae
Articles created by Qbugbot
Beetles described in 1855